The Naval Aircraft Factory TS-1 was an early biplane fighter aircraft of the United States Navy, serving from 1922 to 1929.

Development

While the Vought VE-7s were serving the Navy well in the early 1920s, they were not originally designed as fighters. The Naval Aircraft Factory came up with a simple design driven by a  Lawrance J-1 air-cooled radial engine. Its boxy fuselage was suspended between the upper and lower wings (essentially having both dorsal and ventral sets of cabane struts), with the center area of the lower wing enlarged to accommodate a fuel tank.

The NAF provided Curtiss with the plans to build the aircraft, and the result, designated TS-1, arrived at Anacostia on May 9, 1922. The TS-1 from Curtiss was delivered with wheels, so the NAF also designed wooden floats to enable their use on vessels other than aircraft carriers. Testing went well, and in late 1922 the Navy ordered 34 planes from Curtiss, with the first arriving on board the aircraft carrier  in December. The NAF built another five themselves, as a test of relative costs, as well as four more used to experiment with water-cooled inline engines.

Two all-metal versions of the aircraft, F4C-1s, were developed by Curtiss. This aircraft made its first flight on September 4, 1924. The wings had tubular spars and stamped duraluminum ribs, the fuselage was constructed of duraluminum tubing in a Warren truss form. Compared to the TS-1, the lower wing was raised to the base of the fuselage. The F4C-1 was armed with two  machine guns and was powered by a 200 hp nine-cylinder Wright J-3 radial.

Operational history
In addition to operating from the carrier deck, the TS-1s served for several years in floatplane configuration aboard destroyers, cruisers, and battleships. The aircraft were slung over the side by crane or launched from capital ship catapults. Squadron VO-1 operated this way from 1922, and VF-1 flew its float-equipped TS-1s from battleships in 1925 and 1926.

The TS-1 was not universally liked by its crews. Positioning of the lower wing below the fuselage resulted in short wheel struts. This, and the wheels' placement close to each other, caused considerable problems with ground looping.

Variants
NAF TS-1 five built

Curtiss TS-1 34 built
NAF TS-2 two built,  Aeromarine engine
NAF TS-3 two built,  Wright-Hispano E engine

NAF TR-2 one built, TS-3 modified by changing the airfoil section on the wings for the 1922 Curtiss Marine Trophy race
Curtiss-Hall F4C-1All metal versions for comparison to the original wood and wire construction; two built.

Operators
 
 United States Navy
 VO-1 (Spotting or Observation Plane Squadron) 1922-?
 VF-1 (Fighting Squadron) 1925-1926

Surviving aircraft
 A6446 – TS-2/3 owned by the National Air and Space Museum in Washington, D.C. It was previously on display at the National Naval Aviation Museum in Pensacola, Florida.

Specifications (TS-1 landplane)

References

 Melton USNR, Lt. Comdr. Dick. the Forty Year Hitch. Wyandotte, Michigan: Publishers Consulting Services, 1970

External links

 Curtiss TS-1 SN: A6446 on display at the National Museum of Naval Aviation 
 Curtiss TS-1 SN: A6315 photograph in the National Museum of Naval Aviation collection 

TS
1920s United States fighter aircraft
Single-engined tractor aircraft
Biplanes
Aircraft first flown in 1922